Gerres nigri, the Guinean striped mojarra is a species of mojarra native to the eastern Atlantic Ocean. It inhabits estuaries, coastal waters and lagoons.

Description 
The snout is short, the nostrils close together and the mouth protrusible. The dorsal fin is deeply notched and has nine spines and ten soft rays, while the anal fin has three spines and eight soft rays. The pectoral fin is long, extending to beyond the origin of the anal fin. The back of the fish is olive-brown and the flanks silvery, with longitudinal dark banding. Juveniles have two longitudinal rows of black spots on the dorsal fins and some dark barring on the sides.

Distribution and habitat 
It is a benthopelagic species forming schools and feeding near the seabed, where it favours sandy or muddy substrates. It is found in estuaries and lagoons and can tolerate a wide range of salinities, anything from 25 to 75 ppt.

Relationship with humans 
This fish is the subject of small scale and artisanal fisheries throughout its range. It is caught by trawling, bottom nets and  line gear, and is eaten fresh or dried, seldom being made into fishmeal. It is a common fish throughout its range, and although it may be affected by overfishing, coastal development and water pollution in places, the International Union for Conservation of Nature has assessed its overall conservation status as being of "least concern".

References 

nigri
Fish of the Atlantic Ocean
Fish described in 1859
Taxa named by Albert Günther